Cham Seyyedi-ye Sofla (also Romanized as Cham Seyyedī-ye Soflá and Cham Şeyd-e Soflá) is a village in Hemmatabad Rural District, in the Central District of Borujerd County, Lorestan Province, Iran. At the 2006 census, its population was 23, in 5 families.

References 

Towns and villages in Borujerd County